Insert may refer to:

Insert (advertising)
Insert (composites)
Insert (effects processing)
Insert (filmmaking)
Insert key on a computer keyboard, used to switch between insert mode and overtype mode
Insert (molecular biology)
Insert (SQL)
Fireplace insert
Package insert
Threaded insert
Another name for a tipped tool, a cutting tool used in metalworking
Another name for patch point, a feature on audio mixing consoles
Inserts, a 1974 film directed by John Byrum

See also
 Insertion (disambiguation)